The GTRE GTX-35VS Kaveri is an afterburning turbofan project developed by the Gas Turbine Research Establishment (GTRE), a lab under the Defence Research and Development Organisation (DRDO) in Bengaluru, India. An Indian design, the Kaveri was originally intended to power production models of the HAL Tejas Light Combat Aircraft (LCA) being built by the Aeronautical Development Agency. However, the Kaveri programme failed to satisfy the necessary technical requirements or keep up with its envisaged timelines and was officially delinked from the Tejas programme in September 2008.

Snecma, on a tie up with DRDO, is slated to revive and certify the engine as part of the offsets deal for 36 Dassault Rafale jets purchased by India.

History

Programme 
In 1986, the Indian Defence Ministry's Defence Research and Development Organisation (DRDO) was authorized to launch a programme to develop an indigenous powerplant for the Light Combat Aircraft.  It had already been decided early in the LCA programme to equip the prototype aircraft with the General Electric F404-GE-F2J3 afterburning turbofan engine, but if this parallel program was successful, it was intended to equip the production aircraft with this indigenous engine.

The DRDO assigned the lead development responsibility to its Gas Turbine Research Establishment (GTRE), which had some experience in developing jet engines.  It had developed the GTX37-14U after-burning turbojet, which first ran in 1977, and was the first jet engine to be designed entirely in India. A turbofan derivative, the GTX37-14UB, followed. The GTRE returned to turbojet technology with the greatly redesigned, but unsatisfactory, GTX-35.

For the LCA programme, the GTRE would again take up a turbofan design which it designated the GTX-35VS "Kaveri" (named after the Kaveri River).  Full-scale development was authorized in April 1989 in what was then expected to be a 93-month programme projected to cost . A new engine typically costs up to $2 billion to develop, according to engine industry executives.

Development
The original plans called for 17 prototype test engines to be built. The first test engine consisted of only the core module (named "Kabini"), while the third engine was the first example fitted with variable stator vanes on the first three compressor stages.  The Kabini core engine first ran in March 1995. Test runs of the first complete prototype Kaveri began in 1996 and all five ground-test examples were in testing by 1998; the initial flight tests were planned for the end of 1999, with its first test flight in an LCA prototype to follow the next year. However, progress in the Kaveri development programme was slowed by both political and technical difficulties.

In 2002, little information had been publicly released concerning the nature of the Kaveri technical challenges, but it was known that the Kaveri had a tendency to fail turbine blades, which required procuring blades from SNECMA (as well as digital engine control systems).

Continuing development problems with the Kaveri resulted in the 2003 decision to procure the uprated F404-GE-IN20 engine for the eight pre-production Limited Series Production (LSP) aircraft and two naval prototypes.  The ADA awarded General Electric a 105 million contract in February 2004 for development engineering and production of 17 F404-IN20 engines, delivery of which is to begin in 2006.

In mid-2004, the Kaveri failed its high-altitude tests in Russia, ending the last hopes of introducing it with the first production Tejas aircraft. This unfortunate development led the Indian Ministry of Defence (MoD) to order 40 more IN20 engines in 2005 for the first 20 production aircraft, and to openly appeal for international participation in completing development of the Kaveri.  In February 2006, the ADA awarded a contract to SNECMA for technical assistance in working out the Kaveri's problems.

In April 2005, "There is good progress" on the development of the Kaveri engine, M. Natarajan, Scientific Adviser to the Defense Minister told The Hindu. "We are planning to integrate a prototype Kaveri engine into one of the LCA prototypes sometime in 2007 to understand the nuances of such a complex power-pack," he further told The Hindu.

In February 2006, the US experts told PTI that "Kaveri is truly a world-class engine." "We are ready to join in partnership with the Defence Research and Development Organisation to make Kaveri work," General William J Begert of Pratt and Whitney, told PTI. But DRDO secretary Natrajan told PTI that "But Kaveri is and would remain an Indian project."

On 5 February 2007, Scientific Adviser to Defense Minister M Natarajan said nearly 90 to 93 per cent of the expected performance had been realized and the government had recently floated an expression of interest to seek partners to move the programme further. Till 11 February 2008, Kaveri had undergone 1,700 hours of tests and has been sent twice to Russia to undergo high-altitude tests for which India has no facility. The engine is also being tested to power the next generation of Unmanned Aerial Vehicles.

In July 2007, GTRE divided Kaveri program into two separate programs. They are K9+ Program and K10 Program. K9+ Program is a program to prove concept of complete design and gain hand-on experience of aircraft engine integration and flight trials to cover a defined truncated flight envelope prior to the launch of production version of K10 Standard engine. While K10 Program is a joint venture (JV) partnership with a foreign engine manufacturer. K10 program engine will be final production standard Kaveri engine and shall have less weight and more reheat thrust along with certain other changes to meet the original design intent.

In September 2008, it was announced that the Kaveri would not be ready in time for the Tejas, and that an in-production powerplant would have to be selected. Development of the Kaveri by the GTRE would continue for other future applications. It was announced in November 2008 that the Kaveri engine will be installed on LCA by December 2009, apparently for tests only.

Natarajan told Flightglobal that the programme will not be scrapped. "A team of air force engineers is working with GTRE and ADA in addressing the issues. As an ongoing project, the air force will be involved at the point of integrating the upgraded version of the engine with the aircraft," he told Flightglobal. "Discussions with Snecma have been going on for two years," he further adds. "Development and flight-testing of the new engine will take at least five to six years."

In December 2009, Kaveri-Snecma JV was trying Back-door Entry in LCA. The People's Post reported that GTRE has agreed to de-link Kaveri from LCA, but has put in a proposal that when the first 40 GE-404 engines in the initial two squadrons of the LCA for the IAF, get phased out should be replaced by the Kaveri-Snecma engine, in future.

On 3 May 2010, about 1880 hours of engine test had been completed on various prototypes of Kaveri Engine. A total of eight Kaveri Engines and four core engines have been manufactured, assembled and tested. High Altitude testing on core engine has been completed successfully.

In June 2010, the Kaveri engine based on Snecma's new core, an uprated derivative of the M88-2 engine that powers the French Rafale fighter, providing  of maximum thrust is being considered an option by DRDO.

A press release in August 2010, stated that GTRE with the help of Central Institute of Aviation Motors (CIAM) of Russia is trying to match objective of fine tuning of Kaveri engine performance. Until August 2010, one major milestone which is altitude testing, simulating Kaveri engine performance at different altitude and achieving speed of Mach 1 had been completed successfully. One of Kaveri prototype (K9) was successfully flight tested at Gromov Flight Research Institute in Moscow, on 4 November 2010.

The engine helped the IL-76 aircraft test bed fly at speeds of 0.6 Mach in its maiden flight, according to the Defence Research and Development Organisation (DRDO).

"The engine control, performance and health during the flight were found to be excellent. With this test, Kaveri engine has completed a major milestone of development programme," it added. After completing these milestone Kaveri engine is flight-worthy. The Kaveri engine was tested for the first time on a flying testbed and the trials were a success.

Till April 2011, the first phase of Kaveri engine FTB trials have been completed successfully and further tests will continue from May 2011 onwards. The flight tests successfully carried out so far are up to  maximum altitude and a maximum forward speed of 0.7 Mach.

In its annual report for 2010–11, The Comptroller and Auditor General of India noted that  had been spent on development, with only two out of the six milestones prescribed having been met. Among its deficiencies, CAG says the engine weight was higher than the design specifications, being  against , and there was no progress on developing the compressor, turbine and engine control systems.

On 21 December 2011, "9 prototypes of Kaveri engines and 4 prototypes of Kabini (Core) engines have been developed" told by the then Defence Minister AK Antony in Rajya Sabha. Further on, 2050 hours of test flight of engines has been taken place so far. 27 flights for 55 hours duration have been completed on testbed IL-76 aircraft as well as  maximum forward altitude and a maximum forward speed of 0.7 Mach had been recorded.

Problems

The Kaveri program has attracted much criticism due to its ambitious objective, protracted development time, cost overruns, and the DRDO's lack of clarity and openness in admitting problems. Much of the criticism of the LCA program has been aimed at the Kaveri and Multi-Mode Radar programs. There has been much criticism of the degree of realism in the DRDO's planning schedules for various elements of the LCA programme, most particularly for the Kaveri development effort.  France's SNECMA, with over half a century of successful jet engine development experience, took nearly 13 years to bring the Rafale fighter's M88 engine to low-volume production after bench testing had begun; a similar timespan for the less-experienced GTRE would see Kaveri production beginning no earlier than 2009. Another criticism has been DRDO's reluctance to admit problems in the engine and its resistance to involve foreign engine manufacturers until the problems became too large to handle.

In August 2010, regarding the reasons for delay, a Ministry of Defense press release reported:
 "Ab-initio development of state-of-the-art gas turbine technologies.
 Technical/technological complexities.
 Lack of availability of critical equipment & materials and denial of technologies by the technologically advanced countries.
 Lack of availability of test facilities in the country necessitating testing abroad.
 Non availability of skilled/technically specialized manpower."

Current status
The DRDO currently hopes to have the Kaveri engine ready for use on the Tejas in the latter half of the 2010s decade and according to latest news still research on it is going on and the time to complete its research has been extended to 2011-2012.

"In recent times, the engine has been able to produce thrust of  but what the IAF and other stake-holders desire is power between ", senior officials told The Hindu.  "On using the Kaveri for the LCA, they said the engine would be fitted on the first 40 LCAs to be supplied to the IAF when they come for upgrades to the DRDO in the latter half of the decade." Article further adds that in 2011, 50-60 test flights will be carried out to mature the engine in terms of reliability, safety and airworthiness.

India's Gas Turbine Research Establishment (GTRE) aims to integrate the Kaveri power-plant with the Hindustan Aeronautics Ltd (HAL) Tejas fighter within the next nine months. A test aircraft operated by India's Aeronautical Development Agency will be used for the integration, says an industry source familiar with the programme.
If the integration is successful, the GTRE hopes to see a Tejas fly with a Kaveri power-plant by the end of 2013.

In Lok Sabha on 10 December. 2012 Defence Minister A K Antony gave an update on the progress made by the Kaveri Engine Development Project as follows:

 So far, 9 prototypes of Kaveri Engine and 4 prototypes of Kabani (Core) Engine have been developed.
 2,200 hours of test (ground and altitude conditions) has been conducted.
 The following two major milestones have been achieved:
 Successful completion of Official Altitude Testing (OAT); and
 Demonstration of First Block of flight of Kaveri Engine in Flying Test Bed (FTB).

Kaveri Engine was integrated with IL-76 Aircraft at Gromov Flight Research Institute (GFRI), Russia and flight test was successfully carried out up to  maximum altitude and maximum forward speed of 0.7 Mach. Twenty Seven flights for 57 hours duration have been completed.

DRDO demonstrated its technological capability in aero-engine technology. This has been a great achievement in the aerospace community of the country, when the first ever indigenously developed fighter aircraft engine was subjected to flight testing. Tacit knowledge acquired by the DRDO scientists during this project will also be applied for further aerospace technology.  Kaveri spin-off engine can be used as propulsion system for Indian Unmanned Strike Air Vehicle (USAV).

In January 2013, the GTRE director said that they are abandoning the plan for co-development with Snecma, but they still need an overseas partner, which will be selected through competitive bidding.

In November 2014, The Defense Research and Development Organization (DRDO) decided to abandon the Kaveri engine (GTX-35VS ) programme due to its shortcomings.

As per government statement in Rajya Sabha during Winter Session 2021, HAL Tejas FOC variant demands higher thrust which present Kaveri engine architecture is unable to provide hence will not be used. The engine did achieve higher Technology Readiness Level (TRL) in critical technology domains. There is proposal to jointly develop a new engine for HAL AMCA with the help of foreign partner using the know how from Kaveri engine programme.

Foreign help
On 4 July 2016, according to Indian media report, France offered to invest EUR 1 billion to revive India's combat jet engine project, proposing a joint development plan that could see the stalled Kaveri gas turbine powering indigenous Tejas fighters by 2020.

On 20 November 2016, DRDO Director General for Aeronautics Cluster C P Ramanarayanan confirmed that DRDO and French Snecma have tied up to revive Kaveri Engine as part of the offsets deal for 36 Rafale jet. It is expected that the engine would be integrated and tested in LCA Tejas by 2018. In 2018, La Tribune reported that French Snecma will help in production of the Kaveri by sharing M88's technology.

Design
A low-bypass-ratio (BPR) afterburning turbofan engine featuring a six-stage core high-pressure (HP) compressor with variable inlet guide vanes (IGVs), a three-stage low-pressure (LP) compressor with transonic blading, an annular combustion chamber, and cooled single-stage HP and LP turbines.  The development model is fitted with an advanced convergent-divergent ("con-di") variable nozzle, but the GTRE hopes to fit production Tejas aircraft with an axisymmetric, multi-axis thrust-vectoring nozzle to further enhance the LCA's agility. The core Turbojet engine of the Kaveri is the Kabini.

The general arrangement of the Kaveri is very similar to other contemporary combat engines, such as the Eurojet EJ200, General Electric F414 and Snecma M88. It has a very low bypass ratio (0.16:1). Similar low amounts of bypass on earlier engines, required only for afterburner and nozzle cooling, introduced the term "'leaky' turbojet".

The Kaveri engine has been specifically designed for the Indian operating environment, which ranges from hot desert to the highest mountain range in the world. The GTRE's design envisions achieving a fan pressure ratio of 4:1 and an overall pressure ratio of 27:1, which it believes will permit the Tejas to "supercruise" (cruise supersonically without the use of the afterburner).

Plans also already exist for derivatives of the Kaveri, including a non-afterburning version for an advanced jet trainer, and a high-bypass-ratio turbofan based on the Kabini core. Another concept being considered is an enlarged version of the Tejas which is being called Tejas MK2 with two engines fitted with fully vectoring nozzles, which might make the vertical tail redundant (the Tejas has no horizontal tail).

An indigenous Full-Authority Digital Engine Control (FADEC) unit, called Kaveri Digital Engine Control Unit (KADECU) has been developed by the Defence Avionics Research Establishment (DARE), Bangalore.  The Combat Vehicles Research and Development Establishment (CVRDE) of Avadi was responsible for the design and development of the Tejas aircraft-mounted accessory gear box (AMAGB) and the power take-off (PTO) shaft.

Applications
Plans are also already under way for derivatives of the Kaveri, including a non-afterburning version for an advanced jet trainer and a high-bypass-ratio turbofan based on the Kaveri core, named as Kabini.

 GTX-35VS Kaveri:
HAL Tejas Mk1/Mk1A (planned for production models)
HAL AMCA
HAL TEDBF
 Derivatives:
Kaveri Marine Gas Turbine (KMGT), a recently developed derivative of the GTX-35VS Kaveri engine for ships.
Ghatak, a Kaveri derivative to be developed to power India's Unmanned Combat Air Vehicle DRDO Ghatak.

Specification (GTX-35VS Kaveri)

Engine cycle
Bypass ratio: 0.16:1
Overall pressure ratio: 21.5:1
LP compressor pressure ratio: 3.4:1
HP compressor pressure ratio: 6.4:1
Turbine entry temperature:

See also
 List of aircraft engine manufacturers
 List of aircraft engines

References

External links 

 Kaveri product detail on DRDO website
 Kaveri engine gathers momentum

Low-bypass turbofan engines
1990s turbofan engines